Sihhoya, or Sihaya, is a town in northern Eswatini. It is situated close to the Sand River Reservoir to the north of Bholekane, near the South African border.

References
Fitzpatrick, M., Blond, B., Pitcher, G., Richmond, S., and Warren, M. (2004)  South Africa, Lesotho and Swaziland. Footscray, VIC: Lonely Planet.

Populated places in Eswatini